The 28th Young Artist Awards ceremony, presented by the Young Artist Association, honored excellence of young performers under the age of 21 in the fields of film and television for the year 2006, and took place on March 10, 2007, at the Sportsmen's Lodge in Studio City, Los Angeles, California.

Established in 1978 by long-standing Hollywood Foreign Press Association member, Maureen Dragone, the Young Artist Association was the first organization to establish an awards ceremony specifically set to recognize and award the contributions of performers under the age of 21 in the fields of film, television, theater and music.

Categories
★ Bold indicates the winner in each category.

Best Performance in a Feature Film

Best Performance in a Feature Film - Leading Young Actor
★ Logan Lerman - Hoot - New Line Cinema
 Thomas Sangster - Nanny McPhee - Universal Pictures
 Conor Donovan - Twelve and Holding - Echo Lake Productions
 Alex Neuberger - Running Scared - Media 8 Entertainment
 Cameron Bright - Running Scared - Media 8 Entertainment
 Josh Hutcherson - RV - Columbia/Sony

Best Performance in a Feature Film - Leading Young Actress
★ Keke Palmer - Akeelah and the Bee - Lionsgate
 Sara Paxton - Aquamarine - Fox 2000 Pictures
 Dakota Fanning - Charlotte's Web - Paramount Pictures
 Brie Larson - Hoot - New Line Cinema
 Emily Rios - Quinceañera - Sony Pictures
 Keisha Castle-Hughes - The Nativity Story - New Line Cinema

Best Performance in a Feature Film - Supporting Young Actor
★ Tristan Lake Leabu - Superman Returns - Warner Bros.
 Cameron Bright - X-Men: The Last Stand - 20th Century Fox
 Rory Culkin - The Night Listener - Miramax Films
 Connor Paolo - World Trade Center - Paramount Pictures
 Chase Ellison - End of the Spear - Every Tribe Entertainment
 Troy Gentile - Nacho Libre - Paramount Pictures
 Josh Flitter - Big Momma's House 2 - 20th Century Fox

Best Performance in a Feature Film - Supporting Young Actress
★ Emma Roberts - Aquamarine - Fox 2000 Pictures
 Zoe Weizenbaum - Twelve and Holding - Echo Lake Productions
 Joanna "JoJo" Levesque - Aquamarine - Fox 2000 Pictures
 Hallie Kate Eisenberg - How to Eat Fried Worms - Kragen Productions
 Hannah Marks - Accepted - Universal Pictures
 Lucy Boynton - Miss Potter - MGM
 Alyson Stoner - Step Up - Buena Vista Pictures

Best Performance in a Feature Film - Young Actor Age Ten or Younger
★ Dylan Blue - Deck the Halls - 20th Century Fox
 Seamus Davey-Fitzpatrick - The Omen - 20th Century Fox
 Jimmy Bennett - Firewall - Warner Bros.
 Noah Gray-Cabey - Lady in the Water - Warner Bros.
 Jake Johnson - Talladega Nights: The Ballad of Ricky Bobby - Sony
 Nathan Gamble - Babel - Paramount Pictures
 Jake Cherry - Night at the Museum - 20th Century Fox

Best Performance in a Feature Film - Young Actress Age Ten or Younger
★ Abigail Breslin - Little Miss Sunshine - Fox Searchlight Pictures
 Tatum McCann - Click - Columbia Pictures
 Ryan Newman - Zoom - Revolution Studios
 Chloë Grace Moretz - Big Momma's House 2 - 20th Century Fox
 Elle Fanning - Babel - Paramount Pictures
 Sage Kermes - Sweet Land - Beautiful Motion Pictures

Best Performance in a Feature Film - Young Ensemble Cast
★ How to Eat Fried Worms - New Line CinemaLuke Benward, Hallie Kate Eisenberg, Alexander Gould, Adam Hicks, Ryan Malgarini, Ty Panitz, Philip Daniel Bolden, Blake Garrett, Andrew Gillingham, Austin Rogers, Nick Krause, Stephan Bender and Alexander AgateNanny McPhee - Universal Pictures
Thomas Sangster, Eliza Bennett, Raphaël Coleman, Jennifer Rae Daykin, Holly Gibbs and Samuel Honywood
The Santa Clause 3: The Escape Clause - Disney
Ridge Canipe, Kate Emerick, Madeline Carroll, Eric Lloyd, Spencer Breslin, Liliana Mumy, Darian Bryant, Chantel Valdivieso, Ryan Heinke and Charlie Stewart
Unaccompanied Minors - Warner Bros.
Tyler James Williams, Dyllan Christopher, Dominique Saldana, Gina Mantegna, Quinn Shephard and Brett Kelly

Best Performance in an International Feature Film
Best Performance in an International Feature Film - Leading Young Actor or Actress
★ Sarala Kariyawasam (Sri Lanka) - Water - Fox Searchlight Ivana Baquero (Spain) - Pan's Labyrinth - Warner Bros.
 Alex Pettyfer (England) - Stormbreaker - The Weinstein Company
 Freddie Highmore (England) - Arthur and the Invisibles - MGM
 Nansal Balitguluum (Mongolia) - The Cave of the Yellow Dog - Schesch Filmproduktion
 Jonathan Mason (England) - Lassie - Samuel Goldwyn Company
Dmitry Martynov (Russia) - Night Watch - Fox Searchlight
Jhenbo Yang (China) - Riding Alone for Thousands of Miles - Sony Pictures Classics

Best Performance in a Short Film
Best Performance in a Short Film - Young Actor
★ Hunter Gomez - Rocketboy
 Dominic Scott Kay - Saving Angelo - Bigel Entertainment
 Benjamin B. Smith - The Saddest Boy in the World
 Sean Roche - Happy Valentine's Day
 Kendall McCulty - The Crossing
 Ricardo Gray - Adam's Eve
 Paul Butcher - Imaginary Friend - Greendot Films

Best Performance in a Short Film - Young Actress
★ Megan McKinnon - Little Samantha Tripp
 Kendra McCulty - The Crossing
 Mia Ford - Imaginary Friend - Greendot Films
 Courtney Halverson - Sleepwalk - MH Pictures
 Kali Majors - Bye Bye Benjamin - AFI

Best Performance in a TV Movie, Miniseries or Special

Best Performance in a TV Movie, Miniseries or Special - Young Actor
★ Matthew Knight - Candles on Bay Street - CBS
 Zac Efron - High School Musical - Walt Disney Pictures
 Jason Dolley - Read It and Weep - Disney Channel
 Micah Williams - The Ron Clark Story - TNT
 Brandon Smith - The Ron Clark Story - TNT

Best Performance in a TV Movie, Miniseries or Special - Young Actress
★ Hannah Hodson - The Ron Clark Story - TNT
 Vanessa Anne Hudgens - High School Musical - Walt Disney Pictures
 Sammi Hanratty - Hello Sister, Goodbye Life - ABC Family
 Kay Panabaker - Read It and Weep - Disney Channel
 Maya Ritter - Molly: An American Girl on the Homefront - Disney Channel

Best Performance in a TV Movie, Miniseries or Special - Supporting Young Actor
★ Jake Smith - For the Love of a Child - Lifetime
 Corbin Bleu - High School Musical - Walt Disney Pictures
 Beans El-Balawi - Half Light - TNT
 Jonah Meyerson - Griffin and Phoenix - Lifetime
 Andrew Chalmers - Molly: An American Girl on the Homefront - Disney Channel
 Benjamin Petry - The Lost Room - Sci-Fi Channel

Best Performance in a TV Movie, Miniseries or Special - Supporting Young Actress
★ Emily Hirst - For the Love of a Child - Lifetime
 Niamh Wilson - The House Next Door - Lifetime
 Tory Green - Molly: An American Girl on the Homefront - Disney Channel
 Elle Fanning - The Lost Room - Sci-Fi Channel

Best Performance in a TV Series

Best Performance in a TV Series - Leading Young Actor
★ Kyle Massey - That's So Raven - Disney Channel
 Cole Sprouse - The Suite Life of Zack & Cody - Disney Channel
 Tyler James Williams - Everybody Hates Chris - UPN
 Michael Seater - Life with Derek - Disney Channel
 Dylan Sprouse - The Suite Life of Zack & Cody - Disney Channel
 Devon Werkheiser - Ned's Declassified School Survival Guide - Nickelodeon
 Jamie Johnston - Degrassi: The Next Generation - CTV

Best Performance in a TV Series - Leading Young Actress
★ Christa B. Allen - Cake - CBS
 Ashley Leggat - Life with Derek - Disney Channel
 Emma Roberts - Unfabulous - Nickelodeon
 Jamie Lynn Spears - Zoey 101 - Nickelodeon
 Miley Cyrus - Hannah Montana - Disney Channel

Best Performance in a TV Series - Supporting Young Actor
★ Alexander Gould - Weeds - Showtime
 Daniel Magder - Life with Derek - Disney Channel
 Andrew Chalmers - Darcy's Wild Life - Discovery Kids
 Daniel Curtis Lee - Ned's Declassified School Survival Guide - Nickelodeon
 Paul Butcher - Zoey 101 - Nickelodeon
 Dean Collins - The War at Home - FOX
 Jesse Plemons - Friday Night Lights - NBC

Best Performance in a TV Series - Supporting Young Actress
★ Hayden Panettiere - Heroes - NBC
 Miranda Cosgrove - Drake & Josh - Nickelodeon
 Victoria Justice - Zoey 101 - Nickelodeon
 Emily Osment - Hannah Montana - Disney Channel
 Allie Grant - Weeds - Showtime
 Mackenzie Rosman - 7th Heaven - CW
 Aimee Teegarden - Friday Night Lights - NBC

Best Performance in a TV Series - Young Actor Age Ten or Younger
★ Noah Gray-Cabey - Heroes - NBC
 Trevor Gagnon - The New Adventures of Old Christine - CBS
 Allen Alvarado - Flight 29 Down - NBC
 Khamani Griffin - All of Us - CW
 Lorenzo Brino and Nikolas Brino - 7th Heaven - CW
 CJ Sanders - Saved - TNT

Best Performance in a TV Series - Young Actress Age Ten or Younger
★ Maria Lark - Medium - NBC
 Ariel Gade - Invasion - ABC
 Ariel Waller - Life with Derek - Disney Channel
 Billi Bruno - According to Jim - ABC
 Conchita Campbell - The 4400 - USA
 Emily Everhard - Cake - CBS

Best Performance in a TV Series - Guest Starring Young Actor
★ Darian Weiss - Without a Trace - CBS
 Gavin Fink - E-Ring - NBC
 Alec Holden - The Unit - CBS
 Colby Paul - Supernatural - Warner Bros.
 Kolawole Obileye - Lost - ABC
 Kyle Kaplan - The Bernie Mac Show - FOX
 Skyler Gisondo - House M.D. - FOX
 Joseph Castanon - Shark - CBS
Remy Thorne - Las Vegas - NBC
Austin Majors - According to Jim - ABC

Best Performance in a TV Series - Guest Starring Young Actress
★ Monet Monico - The Suite Life of Zack & Cody - Disney Channel
 Alyson Stoner - The Suite Life of Zack & Cody - Disney Channel
 Emily Hirst - Smallville - CW
 Sammi Hanratty - The Suite Life of Zack & Cody - Disney Channel
 Tay Blessey - Cold Case - CBS
 Chloë Grace Moretz - Desperate Housewives - ABC
 Rachel Rogers - Monk - USA

Best Performance in a TV Series - Recurring Young Actor
★ Daniel Goldman - Dexter - Showtime
 Louis T. Moyle - My Name Is Earl - NBC
 Noah Crawford - My Name Is Earl - NBC
 Masam Holden - ER - NBC
Kasey Campbell - Weeds - Showtime
 Jacob Kraemer - Naturally, Sadie - Disney Channel
 Tyler Patrick Jones - The Ghost Whisperer - CBS
 Cody Linley - Hannah Montana - Disney Channel
 Charlie Stewart - The Suite Life of Zack & Cody - Disney Channel
 Adam Cagley - Ned's Declassified School Survival Guide - Nickelodeon
 Marc Donato - Degrassi: The Next Generation - CTV

Best Performance in a TV Series - Recurring Young Actress
★ Darcy Rose Byrnes - The Young and the Restless - CBS
 Kirsten Prout - Kyle XY - ABC Family
 Tay Blessey - Crossing Jordan - NBC
 Rachel G. Fox - Desperate Housewives - ABC
 Courtney Jines - The War at Home - FOX
 Morgan York - Hannah Montana - Disney Channel
 Sophie Oda - The Suite Life of Zack & Cody - Disney Channel

Best Young Ensemble Performance in a TV Series (Comedy or Drama)
★ Zoey 101 - NickelodeonJamie Lynn Spears, Paul Butcher, Sean Flynn, Victoria Justice, Christopher Massey, Alexa Nikolas, Erin Sanders and Matthew UnderwoodUnfabulous - Nickelodeon
Jordan Calloway, Malese Jow, Emma Roberts, Chelsea Tavares, Emma Degerstedt, Dustin Ingram and Mary Lou
Life with Derek - Disney Channel
Michael Seater, Ashley Leggat, Daniel Magder, Jordan Todosey and Ariel Waller
Darcy's Wild Life - Discovery Kids/Discovery Communications
Andrew Chalmers, Shannon Collis, Melanie Leishman, Demetrius Joyette, Sara Paxton and Kerry Michael Saxena

Best Performance in a Voice-Over Role
Best Performance in a Voice-Over Role - Young Actor
★ Dominic Scott Kay - Charlotte's Web - Paramount Pictures Sam Lerner - Monster House - Sony Pictures
 Anthony Ghannam - Bambi II - Disney
 Mitchel Musso - Monster House - Sony Pictures
 Shane Baumel - Curious George - Universal Pictures
 Alexander Gould - Curious George - Universal Pictures
 Jake T. Austin - Everyone's Hero - 20th Century Fox

Best Performance in a Voice-Over Role - Young Actress
★ Tajja Isen - Jane and the Dragon - YTV Spencer Locke - Monster House - Sony Pictures
 Hailey Noelle Johnson - Curious George - Universal Pictures
 Alyssa Shafer - Happy Feet - Warner Bros.
 Mikaila Baumel - Happy Feet - Warner Bros.

Best Family Entertainment
Best Family Television Movie or Special
★ The Ron Clark Story - TNTHigh School Musical - Disney Channel
Hello Sister, Goodbye Life - ABC Family
Candles on Bay Street - Hallmark/CBS
Molly: An American Girl on the Homefront - Disney Channel
For the Love of a Child - Lifetime

Best Family Television Series (Drama)
★ Friday Night Lights - NBCInvasion - ABC
Saved - TNT
Flight 29 Down - Discovery Kids
7th Heaven - CW
Brothers and Sisters - ABC
The Ghost Whisperer - CBS

Best Family Television Series (Comedy)
★ The Suite Life of Zack & Cody - Disney ChannelDarcy's Wild Life - Discovery Kids
Ned's Declassified School Survival Guide - Nickelodeon
Unfabulous - Nickelodeon
Zoey 101 - Nickelodeon
My Name Is Earl - NBC

Best International Family Feature Film
★ Water (Sri Lanka)Stormbreaker (England)
Arthur and the Invisibles (France)
The Cave of the Yellow Dog (Mongolia)
Lassie (England)
Pan's Labyrinth (Spain)
Riding Alone for Thousands of Miles (China)

Best Family Feature Film (Animation)
★ Curious George - Universal PicturesBarnyard - Paramount
 Cars - Walt Disney Pictures
Flushed Away - DreamWorks/Aardman
Happy Feet - Warner Bros.
Ice Age: The Meltdown - 20th Century Fox
Open Season - Sony Pictures
Over the Hedge - DreamWorks

Best Family Feature Film (Comedy or Musical)
★ Little Miss Sunshine - Fox SearchlightNanny McPhee - Universal Pictures
Click - Columbia Pictures
How to Eat Fried Worms - New Line Cinema
Talladega Nights: The Ballad of Ricky Bobby - Sony Pictures
Hoot - New Line Cinema
Charlotte's Web - Paramount

Best Family Feature Film (Drama)
★ Akeelah and the Bee - LionsgatePirates of the Caribbean: Dead Man's Chest - Walt Disney
Superman Returns - Warner Bros.
Loverboy - Millennium Films
X-Men: The Last Stand - 20th Century Fox
The Nativity Story - New Line Cinema
Flicka - 20th Century Fox

Special awards
Outstanding Young Original Blues-Rock Artist
★ Grant Austin Taylor - Musician/SongwriterOutstanding Young International Variety Group
★ Street Magic (Volshebniki Dvora) - Voronezh, RussiaMichael Landon Award
Inspiration to Youth Through Television
★ Dog Whisperer with Cesar Millan - National Geographic ChannelJackie Coogan Award
Contribution to Youth Through Motion Pictures
Promoting the value of family
★ Will Smith and Jaden Smith - The Pursuit of Happyness

Social Relations of Knowledge Institute Award

Best TV Program or Movie

Furthering the Interest of Youth in Science
★ Good Eats with Alton Brown - Food Network

References

External links
 Official site

Young Artist Awards ceremonies
2006 film awards
2006 television awards
2007 in American cinema
2007 in American television
2007 in California